A by-election for Seine-Maritime's 5th constituency was held in September 2020. Politically the seat has remained a solid bastion for the Socialist Party. In 2017 the seat was a rare example of them retaining a seat.

The deputy, Christophe Bouillon was elected mayor of Barentin on 28 May 2020 and resigned from the National Assembly on 18 June because of cumulation of mandates. His substitute, Bastien Coriton, was also elected mayor, in Rives-en-Seine, so resigned from the assembly five days after taking office. A by-election was called for 20 and 27 September 2020.

Gérard Leseul of the socialists was elected in the second round.

By-election Result
 
 
 
 
 
 
 
 
|-
| colspan="8" bgcolor="#E9E9E9"|
|-

References

2020 elections in France
By-elections to the National Assembly (France)
September 2020 events in France